Pietro Barucci  (born 9 November 1922) is an Italian architect and urban planner, mainly active in his native Rome.

Biography
Born in Rome on 9 November 1922, he was named after his paternal grandfather Pietro Barucci.  He studied architecture under Arnaldo Foschini and Adalberto Libera, and graduated in 1946.

Among his projects, he designed the INA district and the residential complex of La Rosa in Livorno, and the urban residential plan in Naples (1982–92) with the redevelopment of the districts of San Giovanni a Teduccio and Barra. In Rome, he most notably designed the Industrial Institute in Pietralata (1961–70); the ENPAM (Ente Previdenza Medici) headquarters in via Torino (1962–65); the business district of piazzale Caravaggio (1963–69); the ISES-IACP complex in Spinaceto (1965–77); the residential areas of Laurentino (1971–84), Torrevecchia and Quartaccio (1978–84); "Serpentone" residential complex in Tor Bella Monaca (1980–81). He also worked on urban plannings in Tunisia and Ethiopia during the sixties and the seventies.

In June 2018, Barucci stated that the urban planning in Rome had become a disaster, as he criticised the city's corruption.

References

Bibliography

External links

1922 births
Living people
20th-century Italian architects
Architects from Rome
Italian urban planners